Ghost Dragon Attacks Castle is the eighth studio album by the band Carbon Leaf and was released on their own label, Constant Ivy Music.

Track listing

See also

Carbon Leaf

References

2013 albums
Carbon Leaf albums